The 1987 Tour de Romandie was the 41st edition of the Tour de Romandie cycle race and was held from 5 May to 10 May 1987. The race started in Bernex and finished in Chandolin. The race was won by Stephen Roche of the Carrera team.

General classification

References

1987
Tour de Romandie
1987 Super Prestige Pernod International